Hutt Peak is a small but sharply rising snow-covered peak that rises above the general level of the central part of the Mount Bursey massif, in Marie Byrd Land, Antarctica. It was mapped by the United States Geological Survey from ground surveys and U.S. Navy air photos, 1959–66, and named by the Advisory Committee on Antarctic Names for Charles R. Hutt of the U.S. Coast and Geodetic Survey, a geomagnetist-seismologist at South Pole Station in 1970.

References

Mountains of Marie Byrd Land
Flood Range